Richard G. Collins (born August 15, 1949) is an American politician and farmer. He is a Republican member of the Delaware House of Representatives representing District 41. He is the owner of Access Insurance.

Electoral history
In 2014, Collins defeated incumbent John C. Atkins in the general election, winning 52.2% of the vote.
In 2016, Collins won the general election with 59.2% of the vote.
In 2018, Collins won the general election with 60.8% of the vote.

Views 
While Collins denounced the storming of the Capitol in January 2021, he defended Donald Trump and said he was "not surprised that people are angry".

References

External links
Campaign website

Place of birth missing (living people)
1949 births
Living people
Republican Party members of the Delaware House of Representatives
People from Millsboro, Delaware
21st-century American politicians